State Route 226 (SR 226) is a state highway in Elko County, Nevada, United States.

History

SR 226 was part of a much-longer State Route 11 prior to 1976.

Major intersections

See also

References

226
Transportation in Elko County, Nevada